Dead ringer is an idiom in English. It means "an exact duplicate" or "100% duplicate", and derives from 19th-century horse-racing slang for a horse presented "under a false name and pedigree"; "ringer" was a late nineteenth-century term for a duplicate, usually with implications of dishonesty, and "dead" in this case means "precise", as in "dead centre".

The term is sometimes said to derive, like "saved by the bell", from a custom of providing a cord in coffins for someone who has been buried alive to ring a bell to call for help, but this appears to be a folk etymology.

References

English-language idioms